Lauren Sherman is an American journalist.

A former lifestyle reporter at Forbes and a graduate of Emerson College in Boston, Sherman launched The Fashion Beat (http://www.tfbeat.com) in November 2009. She is currently the New York editor of the Business of Fashion, one of the largest independent fashion websites in the US and UK. She was previously Editor at Large at Fashionista.com, and also held the title of Executive Digital Editor at the now defunct Lucky Magazine.

American women journalists
Emerson College alumni
Living people
Year of birth missing (living people)
21st-century American women